Kupino is a rural locality (a selo) and the administrative center of Kupinskoye Rural Settlement, Shebekinsky District, Belgorod Oblast, Russia. The population was 1,296 as of 2010. There are 8 streets.

Geography 
Kupino is located 29 km northeast of Shebekino (the district's administrative centre) by road. Repnoye is the nearest rural locality.

References 

Rural localities in Shebekinsky District